(Polish:) is a village in Karviná District, Moravian-Silesian Region, Czech Republic. It was a separate municipality but became administratively a part of Bohumín in 1974. It has a population of 573 (2022) (together with Kopytov). The village lies in the historical region of Cieszyn Silesia.

The village was first mentioned in a written document in 1482.

The settlement of Kopytov is administratively a part of Šunychl from 1920 and lies on the confluence of the Olza and Odra rivers.

See also 
 Polish minority in the Czech Republic
 Zaolzie

Footnotes

References 
 Description of the village

Neighbourhoods in the Czech Republic
Villages in Karviná District
Cieszyn Silesia